Daedalic Entertainment GmbH is a German video game developer and publisher based in Hamburg. They are best known for developing point-and-click adventure games.

History 
Daedalic Entertainment was founded on 1 March 2007 in a small Hamburg office by chief executive officer (CEO) Carsten Fichtelmann and creative director Jan Müller-Michaelis. Prior to founding Daedalic, Fichtelmann was marketing director for German publisher DTP Entertainment.

Shortly afterwards, the adventure game 1½ Knights – In Search of the Ravishing Princess Herzelinde was developed, named after the same film. On 28 August 2009, the adventure game The Whispered World followed and the adventure title A New Beginning, which focuses on climate change, was published on 8 October 2010. In 2011, the sequel to Edna & Harvey: The Breakout was released with the title Harvey’s New Eyes. A year later, a new adventure named Deponia was released to the market, which received several awards as well.

In May 2014, German publisher Bastei Lübbe acquired a majority share of 51% in Daedalic Entertainment. The following July, Daedalic opened a subsidiary studio, Daedalic Entertainment Studio West, in Düsseldorf.

In November 2016, Daedalic laid off twelve of its roughly 150 employees, primarily from the production and marketing departments, and opted not to renew several temporary contracts. In February 2018, Daedalic opened a third studio, this time in Munich under the name Daedalic Entertainment Bavaria. The new studio would consist of eight people, led by Oliver Machek, formerly of Klonk Games, as studio director and creative director, and by Stephan Harms, chief operating officer of Daedalic, as CEO. In August 2018, as Bastei Lübbe faced severe financial issues, and started considering to sell their 51% stake in Daedalic. In early 2021, the Düsseldorf and Munich studios entered liquidation; the former had been inactive since after creative director Andreas Suika left in August 2019 for Epic Games, while the latter was emptied in late 2020 with all employees rehired by other Munich-based developers.

Nacon announced its intent to acquire Daedalic in February 2022 through purchase of all controlling shares of the company for an estimated . The acquisition was confirmed in April 2022.

Games developed

Cancelled 
 The Devil's Men

Games published

References

External links 
 

Companies based in Hamburg
German companies established in 2007
Video game companies established in 2007
Video game companies of Germany
Video game development companies
Video game publishers
2014 mergers and acquisitions
2022 mergers and acquisitions
Nacon